Urga (Urga — territoriya lyobvi; "Urga — Territory of Love") is a 1991 film by Russian director Nikita Mikhalkov. It was released in North America as Close to Eden. It depicts the friendship between a Russian truck driver and a Mongolian shepherd in Inner Mongolia. The film was an international co-production between companies based in Russia and France. It received generally positive reviews from critics.

Story 

Gombo, a Mongolian shepherd, lives in a yurt in Inner Mongolia with his wife, three children, and mother. Gombo desires sexual intercourse with his wife, which puts his wife ill at unease: having a fourth child would break Chinese law. Meanwhile, Sergei, a buffoon-ish Russian truck driver falling asleep at the wheel, stops after a close call and attempts to awaken himself. His stretching turns to frolicking and he wanders off. He discovers a corpse and quickly returns to his truck, accidentally driving into the river in his haste. Back at the yurt, the family is portrayed as unsophisticated and traditional people. They work together performing simple tasks like weaving by hand and using a horse cart to work leather. Gombo's drunk, horse-riding relative rides through the scene, stopping along the way to give them a movie poster for Cobra, which displays a muscular, gun-toting Sylvester Stallone.

Shortly after, Sergei is rescued by Gombo and taken to his family's yurt. Gombo's young son is stunned by the tattoos on Sergei's back, which include music notes. A comedic scene unfolds as Gombo, together with his family, go about the usual and tidy work of slaughtering and cooking a sheep, much to Sergei's horror. We continue to be entertained as Sergei courageously consumes sheep and sheep broth. At some point we find out that the carrion birds where not eating a human corpse. [There were no subtitles and I don't speak Russian, so I never found out what spooked Sergei.] Gombo shows off the movie poster. Gombo's young daughter plays the accordion while Sergei takes on a distant look as he remembers fighting in the war. The next morning, Gombo's drunk, horse-riding relative rides by, stopping to give Gombo and his wife an apple and a hard-boiled egg.

Gombo and Sergei go into the nearest city together, where Gombo is supposed to buy condoms; instead he chooses to wander the town. Elsewhere, Sergei spends time with his girlfriend and they have sex. Gombo's drunk, horse-riding relative rides through the hallway outside their room, stopping to peek above the door and chuckle. He gives an apple to the woman's son, who is stranded in the hallway until the couple finish. Later, Gombo, Sergei and a friend meet at a nightclub. Sergei, a former army bandsman, becomes drunk and convinces the band to play the song from his tattoos, "On the Hills of Manchuria," while he sings along. He is arrested and bailed out of jail by Gombo's uncle who lives in the city.

Gombo returns home, and along the way stops to eat. We see that he has bought a bicycle and a tv. He falls asleep and has a strange dream featuring his drunk, horseback-riding relative as Genghis Khan and his wife as the Khan's wife. The Khan flies a black flag with a white eagle. In the dream both he and Sergei are captured and killed, while the TV set is destroyed.

Gombo awakes from his dream and arrives home with the TV and other items. The family members interact with the new objects in stereotypical ways: Gombo gives his mother bubble-wrap from the packaging and she proceeds to pop one single bubble at a time, his daughter plays with the bell on the bicycle and his son pops out of the box the tv arrived in. Gumbo ignores his wife so she remains sitting and kneading dough in preparation for dinner. Gumbo, together with his children, set up the tv and a small wind turbine.

He and his family switch between watching a news broadcast, the presidents of the US and Russia officially agreeing to peaceful interaction, and a badly sung variety show. The tv sits under the movie poster. Gombo's wife, saddened when learning that he bought no condoms, leaves the yurt. We then see her on the tv and she invites her husband to follow her with a gesture. Gombo follows leaves the yurt, appears on the tv and follows her out onto the steppes, sticking an urga (a long stick with a lasso on the end used to capture animals) into the ground in a traditional signal that a couple is being intimate. There are shots of the happy family members and Sergei. The scene returns to the urga and a voiceover from Gombo's fourth son, who was conceived at this time, concludes the film. The urga is replaced by an industrial chimney belching smoke.

Cast 
 Badema as Pagma, Gombo's wife / Genghis Khan's wife
 Bayaertu as Gombo
 Vladimir Gostyukhin as Serguei, Russian truck driver
 Baoyinhexige as Bajartou, local weirdo / Genghis Khan
 Bao Yongyan as Bourma, Gombo's daughter
 Wurinile as Bouin, Gombo's son
 Babouchka as Babouchka, Gombo's mother
 Wang Biao as Wang Biao, pianist
 Bao Jinsheng
 Nikolai Vachtchiline as Nikolai, Serguei's friend
 Larisa Kuwnetsova as Marina, Serguei's wife
 Jon Bochinski as Stanislas
 Nikita Mikhalkov as cyclist

Reception

Critical response
Urga has an approval rating of 100% on review aggregator website Rotten Tomatoes, based on 5 reviews, and an average rating of 6.88/10.

Accolades
Urga won the Golden Lion at the Venice Film Festival and Best European Film at the European Film Awards. It was also nominated for an Academy Award for Best Foreign Film, and for a Golden Globe in the same category.

Influence
The film is credited with sparking Czech writer Petra Hůlová's initial interest in Mongolia, leading to study, then an exchange year in Ulan Bator, and then to her first novel, Paměť mojí babičce (2002; literally "in memory of my grandmother"), in English translation published as All This Belongs to Me (2009, Northwestern University Press).

In the first section of Michelangelo Antonioni's film Beyond the Clouds, the two protagonists reunite at a screening of Close to Eden.

See also
 List of submissions to the 65th Academy Awards for Best Foreign Language Film
 List of Russian submissions for the Academy Award for Best Foreign Language Film

References

External links

1991 films
1990s drama road movies
Soviet drama films
1990s Mandarin-language films
Mongolian-language films
1990s Russian-language films
Films set in the 1980s
Films set in Inner Mongolia
Films shot in Inner Mongolia
Golden Lion winners
European Film Awards winners (films)
Films directed by Nikita Mikhalkov
Films scored by Eduard Artemyev
1991 drama films
Films produced by Michel Seydoux
Films with screenplays by Nikita Mikhalkov